Ward 1 is a ward of Da Lat in Lâm Đồng Province, Vietnam.

References

Communes of Lâm Đồng province
Populated places in Lâm Đồng province